Allium sikkimense is a plant species native to Sikkim, Tibet, Bhutan, Nepal, India and parts of China (Gansu, Ningxia, Qinghai, Shaanxi, Sichuan, Xizang, Yunnan). It grows in meadows and on the edges of forests at elevations of 2400–5000 m. The species is cultivated as an ornamental in other regions because of its strikingly beautiful blue flowers. It is used medicinally in the Sikkim Eastern Himalayas.  

Allium sikkimense has a cluster of narrow bulbs generally less than 5 mm in diameter. Scape is up to 40 cm tall. Leaves are flat, narrow, shorter than the scape, up to 5 mm wide. Umbel is a densely crowded hemisphere of blue flowers.

References

sikkimense
Onions
Flora of China
Flora of Sichuan
Flora of Gansu
Flora of Ningxia
Flora of Qinghai
Flora of Shaanxi
Flora of Yunnan
Flora of Tibet
Flora of Sikkim
Flora of Bhutan
Flora of Nepal
Plants described in 1874
Taxa named by John Gilbert Baker